Chelia  is a town and commune in Khenchela Province, Algeria. According to the 1998 census it had a population of 4,851.

Wildlife

The Barbary lion was present in the cedar forests and mountains near Chelia until about 1884.

See also

 Aurès Mountains

References

Communes of Khenchela Province
Khenchela Province